Lee Mi-hyang (born 30 March 1993), also known as Mi Hyang Lee is a South Korean professional golfer.

Lee turned professional in 2011. She earned her LPGA Tour card through qualifying school and played on both the LPGA Tour and Symetra Tour in 2012. She won the Symetra Classic on the Symetra Tour, finished 6th on the money list to retain her LPGA Tour card for 2013, and also won Symetra Tour Rookie of the Year honors. In 2013 on the LPGA Tour, she finished 92nd on the money list to maintain her card.

In 2014, she won the ISPS Handa New Zealand Women's Open in February, co-sanctioned by the Ladies European Tour and the ALPG Tour. In November, she won the Mizuno Classic, co-sanctioned by the LPGA Tour and the LPGA of Japan Tour.

Professional wins (4)

LPGA Tour wins (2)

^ co-sanctioned with LPGA of Japan Tour

LPGA Tour playoff record (1–0)

Ladies European Tour wins (2)
2014 ISPS Handa New Zealand Women's Open (co-sanctioned with ALPG Tour)
2017 Aberdeen Asset Management Ladies Scottish Open

Symetra Tour wins (1)
2012 Symetra Classic

Results in LPGA majors
Results not in chronological order before 2019.

^ The Evian Championship was added as a major in 2013.

CUT = missed the half-way cut
WD = withdrew
NT = no tournament
"T" = tied

Summary

Most consecutive cuts made – 10 (2014 Evian – 2016 British Open)
Longest streak of top-10s – 2 (2018 Evian – 2019 ANA)

References

External links

Seoul Sisters profile

South Korean female golfers
LPGA Tour golfers
Ladies European Tour golfers
Golfers from Seoul
1993 births
Living people